Przybysławice  is a village in the administrative district of Gmina Skała, within Kraków County, Lesser Poland Voivodeship, in southern Poland.

References

Villages in Kraków County